The 2006 legislative elections in Idaho were for all 35 legislative districts.

Results

External links
 Results, via Idaho Secretary of State

2006 Idaho elections
Idaho Legislature elections